The Hambiliya (for "Cache") is a small purse for the safe storage of money and other things on a person, in Sri Lanka. It performs the same function as a pocket, because an Osariya (ඔසරිය) for women and a Sarong (සරම) for men do not have any pockets. The hambiliya is carried on a woman in the folds of her osariya.

Its design is often colourful, using dyed leaves and natural colours from clays and other plant material to produce patterns. It is woven from reed or rush but is also made from palm, Screwpine, Eraminiya and indi kola.

See also
 Inrō
 Sporran

References

Bags (fashion)
Fashion accessories
Sri Lankan clothing
Textile arts of Sri Lanka